Phool is a 1945 Indian Bollywood film. It was the fourth highest grossing Indian film of 1945.The film was directed by K. Asif who went on to make the blockbuster film Mughal-E-Azam .

Cast
 Prithviraj
 Veena Kumari
 Mazharkan
 Suraiya
 Durga Khote
 Yakub
 Dixit
 Agha
 Sitara
 Wasti
 Zilloobai
 Majid
 Ashraf Khan

References

1945 films
1940s Hindi-language films
Films directed by K. Asif
Indian black-and-white films